Bhaskar–Jagannathan syndrome is an extremely rare genetic disorder and there is a limited amount of information related to it. Similar or related medical conditions are arachnodactyly, aminoaciduria, congenital cataracts, cerebellar ataxia, and delayed developmental milestones.

Signs and symptoms 
Bhaskar–Jagannathan has symptoms such as long fingers, thin fingers, poor balance, incoordination, high levels of amino acids in urine, cataracts during infancy, and ataxia. Ataxia, which is a neurological sign and symptom made up of gross incoordination of muscle movements and is a specific clinical manifestation

Cause

Diagnose 
There are three different ways to diagnose Bhaskar–Jagannathan.  This disorder may be diagnosed by a urine test, a blood test, and an X-ray of the eyes or other body parts.

Treatment 
Treatment for this rare genetic disorder can be physical therapy, there have been antibiotics found to be effective, and surgery has been found to be another solution.

References

Congenital disorders
Genetic disorders with no OMIM
Rare syndromes
Syndromes affecting the nervous system
Syndromes affecting the eye